The Office of the Federal Register is an office of the United States government within the National Archives and Records Administration. 

The Office publishes the Federal Register, Code of Federal Regulations, Public Papers of the Presidents, and United States Statutes at Large, among others. It also examines Electoral College and Constitutional amendment ratification documents for facial legal sufficiency and an authenticating signature.

In May 2014, the Office held an "editathon" which focused on improving Wikipedia entries related to government entities.

See also
 Title 1 of the Code of Federal Regulations

References

External links
 
 Office of the Federal Register in the Federal Register
 Administrative Committee of the Federal Register in the Federal Register
 Federal Register 2.0

United States Electoral College
National Archives and Records Administration